Conan O'Brien Show may refer to:
 Late Night with Conan O'Brien (1993–2009), NBC
 The Tonight Show with Conan O'Brien (2009–2010), NBC
 Conan (talk show) (2010–present), a show currently running on TBS that began in November 2010.
 The Legally Prohibited from Being Funny on Television Tour (2010), a live comedy show across the US and Canada